Janet Norton Lee Auchincloss, previously Bouvier, (December 3, 1907 – July 22, 1989) was an American socialite. She was the mother of the former First Lady Jacqueline Kennedy and Lee Radziwill.

Early life
Janet Norton Lee was born on December 3, 1907, in Manhattan, New York City. She was the middle daughter of James Thomas Aloysius Lee (1877–1968), a lawyer and real estate developer, and Margaret A. Merritt (1880–1943). Although she made differing claims about her genealogy including she was “from the Maryland Lees”, both her parents were of Irish Catholic descent. She had two sisters; Marion Merritt Lee (1904–1947), who married John J. Ryan Jr., and Margaret Winifred Lee (1910–1991), who married Franklin D'Olier.

Life
Janet graduated from Miss Spence's School and attended Sweet Briar and Barnard Colleges. She was a member of the Barnard College class of 1929 but records show that she did not graduate. She was a three-time winner of the hunter championship at the National Horse Show.

She served as a board member of the Newport Historical Society and the Redwood Library.  She was also the honorary director of the Robert E. Lee Memorial Association in Stratford, Virginia.

Personal life
Janet was married three times.  In 1928, she married her first husband, John Vernou Bouvier III (1891–1957).  He was the son of Major John Vernou Bouvier Jr. (1866–1948), a successful attorney, and Maude Frances Sergeant (1870–1940). He was also the brother of Edith Bouvier Beale (1895–1977), later known as the subject of the documentary film, Grey Gardens.  Together, they were the parents of two daughters:

Jacqueline Lee Bouvier (1929–1994), who married John F. Kennedy in 1953. After his assassination in 1963, she later married Aristotle Onassis in 1968 and remained married to Onassis until his death in 1975.
Caroline Lee Bouvier (1933–2019), who married Michael Temple Canfield in 1953. Their marriage was annulled in 1959, and later that same year she married Prince Stanisław Albrecht Radziwiłł. They divorced in 1974. In 1988 she married the director Herbert Ross. They also divorced in 2001.

Mr. Bouvier's womanizing and drinking led to a separation in 1936, a brief reconciliation for a few months in 1937, and then a divorce in 1940.

In 1942, she married her second husband, Hugh Dudley Auchincloss Jr., an attorney and Standard Oil heir; becoming his third wife. Together, they had two children:

Janet Jennings Auchincloss (1945–1985), who was married to Lewis Polk Rutherfurd in 1966.
James Lee Auchincloss (born 1947)

Hugh Auchincloss died in 1976. In 1979, she married for a third time, to her childhood friend Bingham Willing "Booch" Morris (1906–1996). Jacqueline served as her witness. Morris, a widower, was a retired investment banker who lived in Southampton, New York, a graduate of St. George's School and Harvard, where he was a member of the Iroquois and Hasty Pudding Clubs, and was the son of Violet Lee (née Willing) Morris and John Boucher Morris of Baltimore.  His late wife, Mary (née Rawlins) Morris, was a bridesmaid at Janet's first wedding. They separated in 1981, but remained married until her death from complications arising from Alzheimer's disease in 1989.

References

Further reading
740 Park: The Story of the World's Richest Apartment Building, by Michael Gross
Janet and Jackie: The Story of a Mother and Her Daughter, Jacqueline Onassis, by Jan Pottke.
"Obituary of James Thomas Lee", The New York Times, January 4, 1968.

1907 births
1989 deaths
American people of Irish descent
American socialites
Auchincloss family
Bouvier family
Deaths from Alzheimer's disease
Deaths from dementia in Rhode Island
People from Newport, Rhode Island
People from Manhattan
Sweet Briar College alumni
Barnard College alumni
Burials at Common Burying Ground and Island Cemetery
Spence School alumni